Olibanic acid is an organic compound that is naturally found in frankincense. Even though it is present in smaller concentrations than other components, it has a highly potent odor and is believed to be one of the key components responsible for the distinctive smell of frankincense. Both the (1S,2S)-(+)-trans and (1S,2R)-(+)-cis enantiomers are present and have similar but not identical "old church"-like odors.

References 

Cyclopropyl compounds
Carboxylic acids